Otitoma cyclophora is a species of sea snail, a marine gastropod mollusk in the family Pseudomelatomidae, the turrids and allies.

Description
The length of the shell varies between 6 mm and 13 mm.

The white shell is elongate, slender and cylindrical. It is transversely finely ridged, interstices striated transversely, longitudinally faintly and obsoletely irregularly ribbed. The sutures are bordered on each side by a crenulated rib, the crenulations connected obliquely by a small ridge. The aperture is rather short. The sinus is broad and deep.

Distribution
This marine species is occurs in the Red Sea; also off Northern Mozambique; the Mascarenes; Queensland, Australia, French Polynesia, the Philippines and Japan

References

 Nevill, G. & Nevill, H. 1875. Descriptions of new marine Mollusca from the Indian Ocean. Journal of the Asiatic Society of Bengal n.s. 44(2): 83–104, pls 7, 8
 Martens, E.C. von 1880. Mollusken. pp. 181–346 in Mobius, K. (ed.). Beitrage zur Meeresfauna der Insel Mauritius und der Seychellen. Berlin : Otto Enslin 352 pp.
  Hedley, C. 1922. A revision of the Australian Turridae. Records of the Australian Museum 13(6): 213-359, pls 42-56 
 Powell, A.W.B. 1966. The molluscan families Speightiidae and Turridae, an evaluation of the valid taxa, both Recent and fossil, with list of characteristic species. Bulletin of the Auckland Institute and Museum. Auckland, New Zealand 5: 1–184, pls 1–23
 Cernohorsky, W.O. 1978. Tropical Pacific marine shells. Sydney : Pacific Publications 352 pp., 68 pls. 
 Wiedrick S.G. (2014). Review of the genera Otitoma Jousseaume, 1880 and Thelecytharella with the description of two new species Gastropoda: Conoidea: Pseudomelatomidae) from the southwest Pacific Ocean. The Festivus. 46(3): 40-53

External links
 
 Jousseaume, F. (1898). Description d’un mollusque nouveau. Le Naturaliste. 20[= ser. 2, 12] (268): 106-107
 Kilburn R.N. (2004) The identities of Otitoma and Antimitra (Mollusca: Gastropoda: Conidae and Buccinidae). African Invertebrates, 45: 263-270
 Morassi M., Nappo A. & Bonfitto A. (2017). New species of the genus Otitoma Jousseaume, 1898 (Pseudomelatomidae, Conoidea) from the Western Pacific Ocean. European Journal of Taxonomy. 304: 1-30
 Gastropods.com: Otitoma cyclophora

cyclophora
Gastropods described in 1863